Niranjan Jyoti (born 1 March 1967), more commonly known as Sadhvi Niranjan Jyoti, is an Indian politician belonging to Bharatiya Janata Party (BJP). She was appointed the Minister of State for Food Processing Industries in November 2014. On 30 May 2019, she was appointed Minister of state in the Ministry of Rural Development in the Narendra Modi 2019 Cabinet.

She represents the Fatehpur constituency, Uttar Pradesh, in the Lok Sabha, after winning in the 2014 general election. She also represents the Hamirpur constituency in the Uttar Pradesh Legislative Assembly after winning in the 2012 election.

Life and career
Niranjan Jyoti was born on 1 March 1967 in the village of Patewra, in Hamirpur district, Uttar Pradesh. Her father was Achyutanand and mother was Shiv Kali Devi. She was born in a Nishad-caste family.

On 14 June 2014, one man called Bhanu Patel and his three accomplices fired at Jyoti as she was returning from a function in Avas Vikas Colony, Lucknow. She escaped unhurt but her bodyguard was injured.

In May 2019, Jyoti became Minister of State for Rural Development.

Personal views and controversies

On 1 December 2014, she stated at a public rally, "It is you whom must decide whether the government in Delhi will be run by the sons of Rama (raamzaade) or by bastards (haraamzaade)" referring to the opposition leader.  The statement caused an uproar in the Parliament. She subsequently expressed regret over her statements and offered to apologize.

References

External links
 Official biographical sketch in Parliament of India website

People from Fatehpur district
India MPs 2014–2019
Lok Sabha members from Uttar Pradesh
Living people
Women in Uttar Pradesh politics
Members of the Uttar Pradesh Legislative Assembly
Bharatiya Janata Party politicians from Uttar Pradesh
Narendra Modi ministry
21st-century Indian women politicians
21st-century Indian politicians
1967 births
Women union ministers of state of India
People from Hamirpur, Uttar Pradesh
India MPs 2019–present